is a Japanese professional golfer.

Inoue plays on the Japan Golf Tour, and has won twice.

Professional wins (3)

Japan Golf Tour wins (2)

Japan Challenge Tour wins (1)

External links

Japanese male golfers
Japan Golf Tour golfers
Sportspeople from Yamaguchi Prefecture
1974 births
Living people